The Echo Label was a British record label started by Chrysalis Group in 1994, and linked with Pony Canyon in Japan. The Chrysalis Group were the original owners of Chrysalis Records, which they sold to EMI.

In 2005, The Echo Label recorded a loss of over £2.0 million. The decision was taken to restructure the business at the beginning of the 2006 financial year, into an "incubator" for developing writer-artists with the intention of "upstreaming" them to a major label. The signings which resulted from this included Bat for Lashes, Steven Lindsay, Rosalie Deighton, Jacob Golden and Sarabeth Tucek. They would continue to release records for their established artists Feeder and Morcheeba. However, in a Chrysalis Group report dated 15 August 2008, it was stated that The Echo Label had performed below management's expectations and had not upstreamed any artists in this period, other than Bat For Lashes, who were transferred to Parlophone in early 2007.

In May 2013, Sony Music Entertainment purchased the distribution rights to Echo material and was re-issued in July under the label. In March 2017, Sony's distribution rights expired, and BMG Rights Management (which acquired the Chrysalis Music publisher in 2010) transferred the distribution to Warner Music Group's Alternative Distribution Alliance division.

The Echo imprint now exclusively sits within BMG, which also administers much of the publishing through the Chrysalis catalogue. Similar to its sister label, Sanctuary Records, Echo continues to exploit a number of artist catalogues, including Feeder, Bat for Lashes, and several artist catalogues acquired from Warner Music (including Supergrass, The Subways, Sigue Sigue Sputnik, White Town, Devildriver, Thomas Dolby and Megadeth).

Echo only exist on Companies House as a legal entity to maintain the copyrights on their releases.

Former artists

 666
 Marc Almond
 Ash (acquired in 2017)
 Babybird
 Bat For Lashes (still signed to Echo/Parlophone)
 Big Yoga Muffin
 Black Rebel Motorcycle Club
 Julian Cope
 Dark Flower
 Deichkind (acquired in 2017)
 Rosalie Deighton
 Denim
 Devildriver (acquired in 2017)
 D'Influence
 Thomas Dolby (acquired in 2017)
 Anne Dudley
 Engineers

 Feeder
 Fred & Roxy
 Jacob Golden
 I Am Kloot
 Ray Lamontagne
 LHOOQ
 Steven Lindsay
 George Martin
 Megadeth (acquired in 2017)
 Moloko
 Mono
 Morcheeba
 Mr. Phillips
 Róisín Murphy

 Nio
 Nitzer Ebb
 Nyack
 .O.rang
 Pranksters
 The Psychedelic Waltons
 Sigue Sigue Sputnik (acquired in 2017)
 Jean Jacques Smoothie
 Spek
 Subcircus
 TBC
 The Stands
 The Subways (acquired in 2017)
 Supergrass (acquired in 2017)
 Fuzz Townshend
 Sarabeth Tucek
 Utah Saints
 The Vacation
 Zu
 Nerina Pallot
 White Town (acquired in 2017)
 Feeder (band)

See also
The Echo Label catalogue
Chrysalis Records
Lists of record labels

References

External links
 

British record labels
Record labels established in 1994
Indie rock record labels
Electronic music record labels